Cha Gi-Suk (26 December 1986 – 13 July 2021) was a South Korean professional footballer who played as a goalkeeper.

Cha was a member of South Korea U-17 and South Korea U-20. He had chronic kidney disease since 2006. Because of this, he never played in Chunnam. In 2006, he received a kidney transplant from his father and 2008 May, after two years, he received kidney again from his uncle. He decided to retire from playing in 2010. He worked as a goalkeeper coach at Yonsei University before quitting after another kidney transplant.

He died on 13 July 2021, aged 34, of AIDS after receiving a donor kidney infected with HIV.

References

External links
 FIFA Player Statistics
 

1986 births
2021 deaths
South Korean footballers
Association football goalkeepers
Jeonnam Dragons players
Gyeongju Citizen FC players
Bucheon FC 1995 players
K League 1 players
K3 League players
Kidney transplant recipients
Deaths from AIDS-related illness
People from Pohang
Sportspeople from North Gyeongsang Province